Ac:r may mean:

 Assassin's Creed Revelations
 Assassin's Creed Rogue